Darren Hambrick (born August 30, 1975) is a former American football linebacker in the National Football League (NFL) for the Dallas Cowboys, Carolina Panthers and the Cleveland Browns. He played college football at the University of Florida, before transferring to the University of South Carolina.

Early years
Hambrick and his brother Troy attended Pasco High School, helping the football team win the 1992 Class 3A state championship. As a senior he posted 140 tackles at linebacker, receiving prep All-American, All-state and area defensive MVP honors.

In track, he was the first athlete in Florida history to qualify for 5 events at the state track meet. He high jumped 7'1 3/4" as a senior. He also practiced basketball.

In 1999, he was chosen as the best football player in Pasco County history by the St. Petersburg Times.

College career
Hambrick accepted a football scholarship from the University of Florida. He was the only true freshman to start a game on defense for the team. He played in 13 games (3 starts) as a "Nickel" linebacker, receiving SEC All-Freshman honors after collecting 46 tackles (5 for loss), 2 interceptions and one sack.

As a sophomore, he had 59 tackles (3 for loss), 3 passes defensed, one sack, a forced fumble, one fumble recovery and 2 interceptions, including an 81-yard interception return for a touchdown against the University of Georgia. He also competed in the high jump and long jump for the Gators track team in 1993 and 1994.

Head coach Steve Spurrier kicked him off the team just prior to the 1995 Sugar Bowl, after he got into an altercation in which he struck another player in the jaw with broken glass.

Hambrick transferred to the University of South Carolina and sat out the 1995 season under NCAA transfer rules. As a junior, he was named honorable-mention All-SEC, after making 83 tackles (4 for loss), 1.5 sacks, 2 forced fumbles and one fumble recovery. He had a career-high 13 tackles against the University of Georgia.

Entering his senior season in 1997, he was named the starter at weakside linebacker, but fractured his left fibula in the season opener against the University of Central Florida. He missed 7 games before returning against the University of Tennessee. He started in the season finale against Clemson University, making three tackles.

Professional career

Dallas Cowboys
Hambrick was selected by the Dallas Cowboys in the fifth round (130th overall) of the 1998 NFL Draft, after dropping because of injuries concerns. As a rookie, he finished second on the team with 18 special teams tackles.

In 1999, he earned the starting job at strongside linebacker for most of the season (12 starts), finishing with 62 tackles (eighth on the team), 2.5 sacks, 3 quarterback pressures, 2 interceptions, a forced fumble and 10 special teams tackles. Prior to the final regular season game, the team convinced Quentin Coryatt to unretire and replace Hambrick in the starting lineup. Coryatt ended up getting hurt and Hambrick started in the Cowboys' playoff loss to the Minnesota Vikings. On January 26, 1999, he was arrested after fleeing from police officers who tried to pull him over for speeding.

Hambrick was seen as a rising player after being the team's leading tackler (154) in the 2000 season, but personal 
problems started to surface when he refused to come out of the final regular-season game and ignored head coach Dave Campo when he was approached after the game. He also engaged in a contract dispute with the Cowboys during the offseason, after feeling mistreated as a restricted free agent, when he was tendered an offer of $512,000 dollars.

After missing two of three minicamps in a protest over his salary, Campo demoted him to second string during the first two weeks of training camp in 2001. He was suspended for the Cowboys' final preseason game and the regular-season opener, because of a curfew violation while the team was in Mexico City to finish the preseason. Hambrick was released by the Cowboys on October 23, 2001, because of personal conflicts and violations of team rules, even though at the time he was fourth on the team with 22 tackles through the first five games of the year.

In Dallas he is best known for replying "What do voluntary mean?" when asked why he did not report to offseason workouts in 2001. His quote is often referenced in jest by the Dallas sports media.

Carolina Panthers
On October 24, 2001, he was claimed off waivers by the Carolina Panthers, starting in eight of nine games and leading the team in tackles twice. During his tenure with the team, he reported as stolen a paycheck from the Panthers he had already cashed. At the end of the season, he wasn't re-signed.

Cleveland Browns
Hambrick signed with the Cleveland Browns for the 2002 season to replace Jamir Miller at strongside linebacker, starting 15 games and helping the team reach the playoffs.

Although he was arrested on a grand theft charge, the Browns offered a $520,000 dollars one-year contract which he turned down to negotiate better conditions. He wasn't re-signed, ending a five-year NFL career that was cut short because of his off-the-field issues.

Tampa Bay Storm
In 2007, he was signed to the practice squad of the Tampa Bay Storm of the Arena Football League, but was waived on June 6.

Personal life
Hambrick is the brother of former NFL running back Troy Hambrick and is also related to former Major League Pitcher Mudcat Grant.

Among a number of criminal incidents, on November 20, 2008 Hambrick was sentenced to 12 months probation after pleading guilty to misdemeanor battery. He then violated his probation in May 2010 and in July 2010 had his probation revoked and was sentenced to 30 days in the Pasco County Jail.

References

External links
Image is everything

1975 births
Living people
African-American players of American football
American football outside linebackers
Carolina Panthers players
Cleveland Browns players
Dallas Cowboys players
Florida Gators football players
People from Pasco County, Florida
Players of American football from Florida
South Carolina Gamecocks football players
Sportspeople from the Tampa Bay area
Tampa Bay Storm players
Pasco High School (Florida) alumni
21st-century African-American sportspeople
20th-century African-American sportspeople